Bobsleigh at the 2014 Winter Olympics was held at the Sliding Center Sanki near Krasnaya Polyana, Russia. The three events took place between 16–23 February 2014.

Competition schedule
The following is the competition schedule for all three events.

All times are Moscow Time (UTC+4).

Medal summary

Medal table

Events

Russian teams were originally awarded the gold medal, but were disqualified by the International Olympic Committee in November 2017 for doping violations.

Qualification

A maximum of 170 quota spots were available to athletes to compete at the games. A maximum 130 men and 40 women might qualify. The qualification was based on the world rankings of 20 January 2014.

Participating nations
169 athletes from 23 nations participated, with number of athletes in parentheses.

References

External links
Official Results Book – Bobsleigh

 
2014 Winter Olympics
2014 Winter Olympics events
Olympics
Bobsleigh in Russia